Da' Miilkrate is the debut studio album by American rapper Miilkbone. It was released on June 20, 1995 through Capitol Records. Recording sessions took place at Marion Studios in Fairview, New Jersey. Production was handled by Mufi, Nick Wiz, KayGee, Butch Whip, Twig and Steve White. It features guest appearances from Kandi Kain, Middy and Trip. The album reached number 81 on the Top R&B/Hip-Hop Albums chart in the United States.

The album spawned two charting singles: "Keep It Real" and "Where'z Da' Party At ?", both of which were minor hits on the Hot Rap Songs chart. "Keep It Real" also reached No. 4 on the Bubbling Under Hot 100 singles chart.

Track listing

Charts

References

External links

1995 debut albums
Capitol Records albums
Albums produced by KayGee